The Darling was an electoral district of the Legislative Assembly in the Australian state of New South Wales from 1904 to 1913, named after the Darling River. It was created in the 1904 re-distribution of electorates following the 1903 New South Wales referendum, which required the number of members of the Legislative Assembly to be reduced from 125 to 90, and consisted of Bourke and parts of The Barwon and Wilcannia. It was abolished in 1913 with most of the district going to Cobar and the balance to Sturt.

Members for The Darling

Election results

References

Former electoral districts of New South Wales
Constituencies established in 1904
Constituencies disestablished in 1913
1904 establishments in Australia
1913 disestablishments in Australia